John Worthington Ames was an American Brevet Brigadier General and engineer who participated in the American Civil War. He commanded the 6th United States Colored Infantry Regiment throughout the war, previously being within the 11th Infantry Regiment.

Early years
John was born on November 23, 1833, at Lowell, Massachusetts. He spent his early career attending schools at Cambridge, Massachusetts, beginning with the Hopkins School before entering the Scientific School of Harvard University and graduating in September 1854. He then travelled to Shanghai, China in December 1854 before becoming a civil engineer at Allen's Grove, Wisconsin on May 14, 1857. In 1859, he became a land surveyor at Bloomington, Illinois under the firm of Haven & Ames. He then spent eight months at Texas as an engineer on the Buffalo, Bayou, Brazos & Colorado River Railroad.

American Civil War
On the outbreak of the American Civil War, Ames became a captain in the 11th Infantry Regiment on May 14, 1861. Ames was brevetted to Major for "gallantry in action" during the Battle of Gaines' Mill. On September 28, 1863, Ames accepted a commission to be given command of the 6th United States Colored Infantry Regiment as a colonel of the regiment. Ames was wounded during the Battle of Chaffin's Farm while commanding the Third Brigade of the Second Division of the XVIII Corps. On January 15, 1865, he was brevetted to Brigadier General for his services throughout the war. After the end of the war, Ames was mustered out on September 20, 1865, at Wilmington, North Carolina.

Later years
Ames married Margaret Corlis Plumly on May 17, 1865, before becoming employed at the Burlington & Missouri Railroad at Iowa as Ames moved to Burlington, Iowa before moving to San Francisco to become a Surveyor-general. Ames was also an author of various magazines and newspapers, mostly about his service during the American Civil War. Ames died on April 6, 1878, at San Rafael, California and was buried at Mount Tamalpais Cemetery.

See also
List of American Civil War brevet generals (Union)

References

1833 births
1878 deaths
People of Massachusetts in the American Civil War
Union Army colonels
Union Army generals
People from Lowell, Massachusetts
Harvard School of Engineering and Applied Sciences alumni
Military personnel from Massachusetts
19th-century American engineers